Tonga Major League is the top football division of the Tonga Football Association in Tonga. The 2021 season's champion was Veitongo FC. Teams are relegated to the Tonga Division II.

The league is not fully professional.

Clubs (2019)

Premier Division
Fahefa
Ha'amoko United Youth
Lavengatonga
Longoteme
Lotoha'apai United
Marist Prems
Navutoka
Veitongo

Division 1
Ahau
Ahononou
Fua'amotu
Houmakelikao Steeler
Houmakelikao 11 Zion
Kolomotu'a
Lavengatonga
Vaolongolongo
Longoteme
Nukuhetulu

Women's
Fahefa
Fasi & Afi
Lavengatonga
Vaolongolongo
Longoteme
Lotoha'apai United
Marist Prems
Navutoka
Veitongo

Previous winners
Previous winners are:

1969–70: Kolofo'ou No.1
1970–71: Kolofo'ou No.1
1971–72: Kolofo'ou No.1, Veitongo and Ngeleia (shared)
1972–73: Unknown
1974: Kolofo'ou
1975: Kolofo'ou
1976–77: Unknown
1978: Veitongo
1979: Unknown
1980–81: 'Atenisi United
1982: Ngeleia
1983: Ngeleia
1984: Ngeleia
1985: Ngeleia
1986: Ngeleia
1987: Ngeleia
1988: Ngeleia
1989: Navutoka FC
1990: Ngeleia
1991–93: Unknown
1994: Navutoka FC
1995–97: Unknown
1998: SC Lotoha'apai
1999: SC Lotoha'apai
2000: SC Lotoha'apai
2001: SC Lotoha'apai
2002: SC Lotoha'apai
2003: SC Lotoha'apai
2004: SC Lotoha'apai
2005: SC Lotoha'apai
2006: SC Lotoha'apai
2007: SC Lotoha'apai
2008: SC Lotoha'apai
2009: Marist Prems
2010: Not played
2010–11: SC Lotoha'apai
2011–12: SC Lotoha'apai
2013: Lotoha'apai United
2013–14: SC Lotoha'apai
2015: Veitongo
2016: Veitongo
2017: Veitongo
2018: Lotoha'apai United
2019: Veitongo
2020: Not held
2021: Veitongo
2022: Veitongo

References

 
1
Top level football leagues in Oceania
Sports leagues established in 1969